The Northern Coast of Egypt ("", North Coast, commonly shortened to  "", "The Coast" or "The Egyptian Coast") extends for about  along the Mediterranean Sea, it covers entirely the northern territory of Egypt. It is one of the longest Mediterranean coastlines in North Africa.

The city of Alexandria lies at the center of Egypt's Mediterranean coastline in Lower Egypt (northern Egypt), as chosen by Alexander the Great in the 4th century BCE. The north coast has been the hub of sea travel between the Mediterranean Sea and the Nile Delta for over 2,300 years. During summer, Egyptians usually travel to the North Coast to flee heat in other towns and cities in Egypt. They stay in villages and resorts located in Sidi Abdel Rahman, El Alamein, and Ras Al Hekma.

History
In the period of the Eocene era, the area of what is part of modern-day Egypt was an ancient sea, but for the next millions of years, sea shells such as nummulites were collected above the seabed. They were then formed into limestone, which would later be used to build the Ancient Egyptian monuments.

Over intervals of time, the northern coast of Egypt had come under a series of foreign conquests and dominations, including the Achaemenids, Macedonians, Romans, Byzantines, the French, the Ottomans, the Napoleonics and the British.

Geography and nature
On contrast to Egypt's Red Sea Riviera, its Mediterranean coastline is totally plain with low altitude shrublands along the region, except for the westernmost portion which is formed by the 400m-high Marmarika Plateau. It is also characterised by the occurrence of Egypt's five northernmost lakes.

The region has typical Mediterranean flora and fauna on land and in marine life with the weather being between pleasant and hot during summer and mild in winter. The region receives the most rain in Egypt, hail and sleet fall rarely in winter. Snowfalls occur in some inland towns and locations.

Climate

Even though most of Egypt lies within the hot desert climate (BWh) according to Köppen climate classification with little precipitation, prevailing winds from the Mediterranean sea greatly moderate the temperatures of the northern coastal line, making the summers moderately hot and humid, while the winters moderately wet and mild, when sleet and hail are also common, in and around the wettest places, as Alexandria.

Cities, towns and villages
Egypt's Mediterranean coast can be differentiated into 4 subregions:

 Western North Coast: Which has higher rain precipitation. Higher altitude witnesses higher snowfalls and it is colder than the other 3 portions. It also has more shrubbed and forested terrain, but no lakes. This subregion faces Greece and Crete. A number of summer resorts span between Marsa Matruh and Alexandria with those West of El Alamein becoming more popular in recent years. It has cities, towns and villages such as:
 Sallum, a border town near the Egypt–Libya border.
 Baqiqi a fishing local village.
 Sidi Barrani a snowy town, and Egypt's closest inhabited settlement towards Europe and Greece.
 Shammas a fishing local village.
 Zawyet Umm El Rakham a village with archeological sites.
 Marsa Matruh the main seaport on Egypt's Western Mediterranean coast.
 Fuka a village famous for excellent Mediterranean fruits and touristic beaches.
 El Dabaa is a main town
 Sidi Abdel Rahman a new touristic seaport town with a number of leading resorts like Hacienda bay and white, Marassi (made by Emaar), Lazorde and Diplo.
 Central North Coast: The southernmost Mediterranean shoreline in Egypt, forming a big gulf. It has no lakes. This subregion faces the West of Turkey. It has cities, towns and villages such as:
 El Alamein the southernmost Mediterranean coastal city
 Marina, Egypt a leading Egyptian major resorts town, and host site of Ancient Egyptian and Roman monuments.
 Sidi Kreir a major town and municipality
 Borg El Arab a major city
 Alexandria the main Mediterranean city and seaport. At the center of the entire Medi coastline and the second largest city in Egypt.
 Delta's North Coast: Which is settled by larger populations and hosts larger cities, with the exception of Alexandria. It has the Nile Delta which features hail and sleet in winters. Sometime frost and frozen ground during winter nights destroy the crops and agriculture plants. Three of Egypt's Northern Lakes are located there: Lake Mariout, Edko Lake and Lake Burullus. This subregion faces Central Turkey. Its cities, towns and villages are:
 Rosetta a historic western Nile delta city where Rashid's Nile branch and Mediterranean meet (aka Rashid)
 Baltim at the northern tip of the Nile Delta. One of North Africa's northernmost towns
 Gamasa a local touristic city
 Ras El Bar a touristic city for locals where the Damietta's Nile branch and the Mediterranean meet
 Ezbet El Borg is a fishing city at the other bank of the Damietta River
 Damietta a major eastern Nile Delta city and seaport in Egypt
 Eastern North Coast: It has the least precipitation, yet its cities and towns are of great geopolitical and economic importance. It is colder on its eastern part than its other part. 2 Northern lakes of Egypt are found in this subregion as well: Lake Manzala and Lake Bardawil. This subregion faces Cyprus and Turkey. It has cities, towns and villages like:
 Port Said a European styled-city, entrance to Suez Canal and Egypt's major eastern seaport
 Arish major east seaport on Arish river and Arish valley
 Rafah Egypt's last eastern Mediterranean city on the border with the Gaza Strip.

See also
 Riviera

References

Geography of Egypt
Tourism in Egypt
Coasts of the Mediterranean Sea
Landforms of Egypt
Alexandria Governorate
Matrouh Governorate
North Sinai Governorate
Port Said Governorate
Coasts